Bob Honeysett (1933–2017) was an Australian former professional rugby league footballer who played in the 1950s and 1960s. He played for the South Sydney and North Sydney in the New South Wales Rugby League (NSWRL) competition.

Playing career
Honeysett played his junior rugby league with the South Sydney Fernleighs and was a member of Souths' 1953 winning Presidents Cup team. Honeysett made his first grade debut in round 7 of the 1954 NSWRL season against Parramatta scoring a try on debut during a 18-11 victory at Cumberland Oval. In 1955, Honeysett played the majority of the season including two of the clubs finals matches but was left out of the grand final team which defeated Newtown due to a broken hand. In 1958, Honeysett joined North Sydney and played two seasons for the club. In 1960, he was captain-coach of the Young Cherrypickers.

Representative career
Honeysett represented New South Wales on four occasions. In 1959, it was reported that he came the first indigenous player to captain the New South Wales team. His last call up was earned whilst playing for the Wagga Magpies in 1962. Honeysett also represented New South Wales Country and City teams.

References

1933 births
2017 deaths
South Sydney Rabbitohs players
North Sydney Bears players
Rugby league players from Sydney
Australian rugby league players
Rugby league centres
New South Wales rugby league team players